Mondale is an American surname of Norwegian origin. The surname "Mondale" comes from Mundal by Fjærland, in the Sogndal municipality in Norway.

The name is primarily associated with just one American family:
Walter Mondale (1928–2021), 42nd vice president of the United States
Joan Mondale (1930–2014), wife of Walter Mondale
Eleanor Mondale (1960–2011), American radio personality and actress, daughter of Walter Mondale
Ted Mondale (born 1957), American politician and entrepreneur, son of Walter Mondale
Lester Mondale (1904–2003), American minister, half brother of Walter Mondale

References